Toshiwo Doko (土光 敏夫 Dokō Toshio; September 15, 1896 – August 4, 1988) was a Japanese engineer born in Mitsu District, Okayama, Manager, President and Chairman of Ishikawajima Heavy Industry (IHI) and Toshiba.

Background
Dokō was a key manager in the Japanese economic miracle after World War II, in particular, from 1974 to 1980 when he helmed the Toshiba Corporation and was appointed chairman of the Japan Business Federation (Keidanren).

After graduating from Tokyo Institute of Technology (or Tokyo Kogyo Daigaku) in 1920, Dokō worked at the Ishikawajima Shipyard Co., first as a designer of turbines and then became a president from 1950 to 1960, during which he renewed the company to benefit from significant procurement provided by the United States during the Korean War. 

Dokō later chaired the Ishikawajima-Harima Heavy Industries Co. Ltd. during the merger in 1960, overseeing the construction of the Idemitsu Maru, the largest tanker in the world. At Toshiba, he functioned as a  vice president between 1965 and 1972, and became the president between 1972 and 1976. He raised the morale of the workers driving the company towards prosperity.
During 1970's, he had a relationship with a company such as Standard Oil.

When belonging to IHI, he had never been late and absent from the company for 40 years, continuously. Surprisingly, his breakfast had been very simple, and consisted of a piece of fish, rice and miso soup. Even though he became the top position of IHI and very rich, his lifestyle and breakfast had not changed at all. Despite the simple breakfast, his hardworking attitude was not changed even when he turned to 85 year old. In addition, he rarely used air-conditioner during Winter and Summer, and he donated more than half of his salary, during 1970's, for the school that his mother had established in Yokohama. No one can criticize his behavior for this emerging global warming.

In 1988, he posthumously received the highest distinction of the Scout Association of Japan, the Golden Pheasant Award.

References

External links
New York Times Obituary -  Toshiwo Doko Is Dead; Industry Chief Was 91

1896 births
1988 deaths
People from Okayama
20th-century Japanese engineers
Toshiba people
Tokyo Institute of Technology alumni